Marcinów may refer to the following villages in Poland: 
Marcinów, Greater Poland Voivodeship (west-central Poland) 
Marcinów, Kutno County in Łódź Voivodeship (central Poland) 
Marcinów, Pajęczno County in Łódź Voivodeship (central Poland) 
Marcinów, Poddębice County in Łódź Voivodeship (central Poland) 
Marcinów, Lower Silesian Voivodeship (south-west Poland) 
Marcinów, Lublin Voivodeship (east Poland) 
Marcinów, Żagań County in Lubusz Voivodeship (west Poland) 
Marcinów, Żary County in Lubusz Voivodeship (west Poland)